Kut-e Sheykh (also Romanized as Kūt-e Sheykh, Koot Sheikh, Kut ash Shaikh, Kūt osh Sheykh, and Kūt Sheykh) is a village in Howmeh-ye Gharbi Rural District, in the Central District of Ramhormoz County, Khuzestan Province, Iran. At the 2006 census, its population was 171, in 31 families.

References 

Populated places in Ramhormoz County